The 2006 California State Controller election occurred on November 7, 2006. The primary elections took place on June 6, 2006. Board of Equalization Chair John Chiang, the Democratic nominee, defeated the Republican nominee, Assemblyman Tony Strickland, for the office previously held by Democrat Steve Westly, who ran for governor.

Primary results
A bar graph of statewide results in this contest are available at https://web.archive.org/web/20070517222238/http://primary2006.ss.ca.gov/Returns/ctl/00.htm.

Results by county are available here and here.

Democratic

Republican

Others

Results

Results by county
Results from the Secretary of State of California:

See also
California state elections, 2006
State of California
California State Controller

References

External links
VoteCircle.com Non-partisan resources & vote sharing network for Californians
Information on the elections from California's Secretary of State
Official Homepage of the California State Controller

2006 California elections
California State Controller elections
November 2006 events in the United States
California